Don Alfredo may refer to:

  Don Alfredo, a brand of cigars produced by Dunhill
 Don Alfredo (cocktail), a cocktail of modern Peruvian cuisine